This is a list of Bahamas Twenty20 International cricketers.

In April 2018, the ICC decided to grant full Twenty20 International (T20I) status to all its members. Therefore, all Twenty20 matches played between Bahamas and other ICC members after 1 January 2019 are eligible for T20I status. Bahamas will play their first T20I matches in November 2021 during the 2021 ICC T20 World Cup Americas Qualifier in Antigua.

This list comprises all members of the Bahamas cricket team who have played at least one T20I match. It is initially arranged in the order in which each player won his first Twenty20 cap. Where more than one player won his first Twenty20 cap in the same match, those players are listed alphabetically by surname.

Key

List of players
Statistics are correct as of 4 March 2023.

References 

Bahamas